Antonio Merlo is an Italian-born American economist and academic. He currently serves as the Anne and Joel Ehrenkranz Dean of the Faculty of Arts and Science at New York University.

Early life 
Antonio Merlo was born in Italy in 1963. A first-generation college graduate, he received a Laurea summa cum laude in economics and social sciences from Bocconi University in Milan in 1987. Merlo emigrated to the United States in 1988 and earned a PhD in economics from New York University in 1992.

Career 
Merlo began his academic career in 1992 as an assistant professor of economics at the University of Minnesota, where he was promoted to associate professor with tenure in 1998. Between 1998 and 2000 he held a joint appointment in the Department of Economics and the Department of Politics at New York University. In 2000, he joined the faculty at the University of Pennsylvania, where he held the Lawrence Klein Chair of Economics and the Directorship of the Penn Institute for Economic Research (PIER) until 2014. He was also the chair of the economics department from 2009 to 2012. In 2014, Merlo joined Rice University as the George A. Peterkin Professor of Economics, the chair of the economics department, and the Founding Director of the Rice Initiative for the Study of Economics (RISE). From 2016 to 2019, he served as dean of the Rice University School of Social Sciences. In 2019, Merlo returned to his alma mater as the Anne and Joel Ehrenkranz Dean of NYU's Faculty of Arts and Science and Professor of Economics.

In 2012, Merlo was elected a Fellow of the Econometric Society.  In 2014, he delivered the Vilfredo Pareto Lecture at the Collegio Carlo Alberto. Merlo's areas of expertise are political economy, policy analysis, public economics, bargaining theory and applications, and empirical microeconomics. His research interests include the economics of crime, voting, the career decisions of politicians, the formation and dissolution of coalition governments, the industrial organization of the political sector, household bargaining and the study of the residential housing market. He has published numerous articles in the leading journals in the profession, including the American Economic Review, Econometrica, the Journal of Political Economy, and the Review of Economic Studies.

Books 
 The Ruling Class Management and Politics in Modern Italy (with Tito Boeri and Andrea Prat, Oxford University Press, 2010) 
 Political Economy and Policy Analysis (Routledge, 2019)

Other leadership positions 
From 2008 to 2014, Merlo was the Head Coach of the men's water polo team of the University of Pennsylvania. He led the Penn Quakers to three championship titles in the Mid-Atlantic Division of the Collegiate Water Polo Association (CWPA) in 2008, 2010, and 2013, the 2013 Ivy League Collegiate Club Championship, and a fifth place finish at the National Collegiate Club Championship in 2013.  From 2016 to 2019, Merlo was the Head Coach of the men's and women's water polo teams at Rice University.  In 2013, 2017, and 2018, he won Coach of the Year in the CWPA men's Mid-Atlantic Division, women's Texas Division, and men's Texas Division, respectively.

Personal life 
Antonio Merlo is married to Dr. Gia Merlo, a board certified physician in adult psychiatry, child & adolescent psychiatry, and lifestyle medicine. They have two children, Monisha Lewis and Martina Merlo.

References

Fellows of the Econometric Society
1963 births
People from Legnano
Rice University faculty
Bocconi University alumni
New York University alumni
University of Minnesota faculty
University of Pennsylvania faculty
Penn Quakers coaches
Italian emigrants to the United States
College men's water polo coaches in the United States
American university and college faculty deans
Political economists
21st-century American economists
American people of Italian descent
Public economists
Microeconomists
Living people